Vincenzo Maria Coronelli (August 16, 1650 – December 9, 1718) was an Italian Franciscan friar, cosmographer, cartographer, publisher, and encyclopedist known in particular for his atlases and globes. He spent most of his life in Venice.

Biography
Vincenzo Coronelli was born, probably in Venice, on August 16, 1650, the fifth child of a Venetian tailor named Maffio Coronelli. At ten, young Vincenzo was sent to the city of Ravenna and was apprenticed to a xylographer.  In 1663 he was accepted into the Conventual Franciscans, becoming a novice in 1665.  At age sixteen he published the first of his one hundred forty separate works.  In 1671 he entered the Convent of Saint Maria Gloriosa dei Frari in Venice, and in 1672 Coronelli was sent by the order to the College of Saint Bonaventura and Saints Apostoli in Rome where he earned his doctor’s degree in theology in 1674.  He excelled in the study of both astronomy and Euclid.  A little before 1678, Coronelli began working as a geographer and was commissioned to make a set of terrestrial and celestial globes for Ranuccio II Farnese, Duke of Parma.  Each finely crafted globe was five feet in diameter (c. 175 cm) and so impressed the Duke that he made Coronelli his theologian. Coronelli's renown as a theologian grew and in 1699 he was appointed Father General of the Franciscan order.

Later life

Coronelli worked in various European countries in the following years, before permanently returning to Venice in 1705. Here he started his own cosmographical project and published the volumes of Atlante Veneto. He also held the position of Cosmographer of the Republic of Venice. Later six volumes of the Biblioteca Universale Sacro-Profana were published by Coronelli. This was a kind of encyclopedia, its compiled entries ordered alphabetically.

Coronelli died at the age of 68 in Venice, having created hundreds of maps in his lifetime.  

The International Coronelli Society for the Study of Globes, founded 1952 in Vienna, is named in Coronelli's honor.

Globes for Louis XIV

Cardinal César d'Estrées, friend and adviser to Louis XIV and ambassador to Rome, saw the Duke of Parma’s globes and invited Coronelli to Paris in 1681 to construct a pair of globes for the Most Christian King.  Coronelli moved to the French capital in 1681, where he lived for two years.  Each globe was composed of spindles of bent timber about ten feet long and four inches broad at the equator.  This wood was then coated with a layer of plaster about an inch thick and covered in a layer of strong unfinished fabric.  This was then wrapped in a quarter-inch layer of two very fine fabrics which provided backing for the painted information of the globes.  These globes, measuring 384 cm in diameter and weighing approximately 2 tons, are displayed in the Bibliothèque nationale François Mitterrand in Paris.  The globes depicted the latest information of French explorations in North America, particularly the expeditions of René-Robert Cavelier, Sieur de La Salle.

The Bergamo Globes
The request for "Globes" started as private princely commissions from a highly discriminating class, mostly concentrated in the courts of Northern and Central Europe. The art of coated cards globes, terrestrial or celestial, handwritten and often finely decorated, originated in Italy. Coronelli was among the initiators of this art. The most famous Coronelli globes are divided into 2 groups: the first includes the Globes manufactured for the Duke of Parma and Louis XIV, which are unique for their extraordinary quality; the second one includes those built since 1688, as result of the fame of the first.
Indeed, the quality of globes made for Louis XIV created the "request" for other Coronelli's globes. Their reputation was so wide that they inspired requests from the highest classes and institutions, desiring to adorn their libraries with these elements not only for scientific use but also as artistic ornaments. 
It is to this intent the two globes that we admire today in the Salone Furietti of Angelo Mai Library arrived in Bergamo. The history of the two globes is closely tied to cultural events and policies that have affected the city of Bergamo in the last 500 years. The two Coronelli globes came to Bergamo in 1692, when Angelo Finardi, man of letters and Augustinian friar  was librarian at the Augustinian monastery. He commissioned ta man to buy them in Venice just with the intent of equipping the monastery library with essential tools of culture. In 1797, the monastery was suppressed. Both the globes met with the confiscations of Napoleonic laws and were on the way to Paris, gathered along with the Versailles globes. Nevertheless, thanks are owed to the noble Giovanni Battista Vertova, who hid the two globes in his home in 1834, and to his son Andrea, by whom they were donated to the Bergamo Library.

Current locations of 110cm globes
Other 110cm diameter Coronelli globes are at 

 the National Library of Austria (two pairs of 110cm diameter globes are on display in the Prunksaal) 
 a pair in the Globe Museum in Vienna, 
 in the library of Stift Melk, 
 in Trier, Prague, 
 Paris, 
 the British Library, London (celestial globe only), 
 Washington D.C., 
 the Palazzo Poggi in Bologna (terrestrial globe only), 
 Palazzo Sacchetti in Rome, 
 the Museo della Specola in Bologna (terrestrial globe only),
 the Observatory of Strasbourg (celestial globe only)
 a pair at Muzeum Narodowe w Warszawie in Poland,
 Poznań Town Hall (terrestrial globe only)
 a pair in the Biblioteca Federiciana in Fano. 
 Having been restored and completed, another 1688 terrestrial globe is displayed at the Southwest Collection/Special Collections Library of Texas Tech University in Lubbock, Texas. 
 The Ransom Center at The University of Texas in Austin has a pair of Coronelli globes both the 1688 Terrestrial and the Celestial (n.d.).
 a pair in the Biblioteca Marciana in Venice
 a pair in the Library Angelo Mai in Bergamo, while another two globes are now in restoration being part of the FAI project "Save the Globes".

Selected maps

1690-91 Atlante Veneto
1696-97 Isolario dell' Atlante Veneto
1996 Londra
1692 Corso geografico universale
1695 Re-issued
1693 Epitome Cosmografica
1693 Libro dei Globi
1701 Re-issued
1695 World Map
1696 Pacific Ocean

Partial bibliography
 Morea, Negroponte & Adiacenze (1686).
 Atlante Veneto (1691 - 1696).
 Ritratti de celebri Personaggi (1697).
 Lo Specchio del Mare (1698).
 Singolarità di Venezia (1708-1709).
 Roma antico-moderna (1716).

References

External links

 
 Les globes du Roi Soleil, exposition de la BNF
 Hall des Globes (bibliothèque nationale de France)
 List of the works of Vincenzo Coronelli (1650-1718) at the Marciana National Library, Venice
 Picture of one of Coronelli's maps of the Koron fortress, Greece, excellent quality
  Reconstructions of the globes of Vincenzo Coronelli
  Original technology 42 " diam. Coronelli globe
 Pictures of facsimiles of Coronelli's 1688 & 1693 terrestrial and celestial globes
 Six plates from Coronelli's Epitome cosmografica of 1693: facsimiles of his only flat printed maps, at Linda Hall Library.
 High resolution 3D visualization of the Louis XIV globes made by the C2RMF
 Sphère céleste, 1688
 Sphère terrestre, 1688

17th-century Italian cartographers
Republic of Venice scientists
1650 births
1718 deaths
Catholic clergy scientists
Conventual Friars Minor
Ministers General of the Order of Friars Minor Conventual
Italian encyclopedists
Italian engravers
17th-century Venetian writers
18th-century Venetian writers